Sudigadu is a 2012 Indian Telugu-language parody film directed by Bhimaneni Srinivasa Rao and produced by Chandrasekhar D Reddy under Arundathi Movies. It is the remake of C. S. Amudhan's debut Tamil film Thamizh Padam. The film stars Allari Naresh and Monal Gajjar. Allari Naresh plays double roles in this movie as father and son.

The film was released on 24 August 2012, The film received mixed reviews, who appreciated comical performances of the cast, humor, and drama, but criticized for screenplay, unrealistic situations, narration, and Rao's direction.

Plot
Kamesh and his wife become the proud parents of a dynamic and powerful new baby who is born with a six pack body. Just when the baby is born, Thikkal Reddy comes in as the villain in search of his enemy who runs into New Born Baby's room. He prays to god to save him and hides in the room. The New Born Baby does urination for a long time which leads to the death of Thikkal Reddy's elder son and he becomes a sworn enemy of the baby. To save the baby from Thikkal Reddy, Kamesh gets his mother to escape to Hyderabad. The baby grows up into Siva, a powerful and dynamic young guy with seemingly invincible powers like a Telugu Cinema hero.

Siva can make bullets stop, challenge time and even make Posani Krishna Murali speak intelligently. On a side note, Siva meets Priya over the course of time and falls in love with her. Thikkal Reddy's gang members keep hunting for Siva and he decides to fight back. He also faces resistance from the mysterious Don D.

He fights them all with his powers and it is revealed that he is Siva Manohar I.P.S., a Young Cop in Undercover Operation. He has all the villains dead and when it comes to Don D, it is none other than his Grand Mother. She does so as to elevate Siva as a powerful hero and herself as a Don. At the court both are Exonerated and Siva is promoted as D.G.P. of Andhra Pradesh.

Cast

 Allari Naresh as Kamesh Suresh Naresh / Shiva Manohar I.P.S. a.k.a. Shiv
 Monal Gajjar as Priya
 Sayaji Shinde as Priya's father
 Brahmanandam as Jaffa Reddy / CBI officer Jaffa Rai
 Jaya Prakash Reddy as Thikkal Reddy
 Kovai Sarala as Kamesh's Mother / Don D
 Ali as Doctor 
 M. S. Narayana as Rambo
 Krishna Bhagavaan as Priya's Father's P.A.
 Raghu Babu as Thikkal Reddy's henchman
 Venu Madhav as Car Driver (Special Appearance)
 Chandra Mohan in a Cameo appearance
 Chalapathi Rao as Commissioner of Police of Hyderabad
 Dharmavarapu Subramanyam as Rayudu 
 Posani Krishna Murali in a Cameo Appearance
 L.B. Sriram as Remo
 Kondavalasa as Robo
 Jeeva as D.G.P. of Andhra Pradesh
 Srinivasa Reddy as Siddha 
 Shankar Melkote as Judge 
 Dhanraj in a Cameo Appearance
 Shiva Shankar Master as himself
 Suman Setty as Rambo's Father 
 Narsing Yadav as Narsing 
 Chammak Chandra as Reality Show Host
 Hema as Kamesh's wife
 Thagubothu Ramesh
 Fish Venkat
 Prudhvi Raj as 30 years corporator
 Sri Latha as Hasini
 Yadagari Rodda as Enemy of Thikkal Reddy 
 Kishore Daas as Thodagottudu school principal
Jyothi Labala as Kamesh's keep

Critical reception
 
Sudigadu has received mostly positive reviews from critics and audience. The Times Of India gave a rating of 4/5. The Hindu stating "Sudigadu is definitely worth a watch. The humour, here, is without malice and that itself is a big plus. NDTV gave a review stating "Bhimaneni Srinivas's Telugu film Sudigadu is a laugh riot that keeps the audience entertained right up till the end". Radhika Rajamani of Rediff gave a review stating "The film offers fun unlimited and will surely go down well with families". Mahesh Koneru of 123telugu.com gave a rating of 3.25/5 stating "Sudigaadu is a good clean entertainer that will make you laugh out loud. The spoofs are brilliant. Sudigaadu is one very enjoyable spoof on TFI and it makes for a good watch this weekend. Don’t miss it.".

Box office
Sudigadu has rocked the film goers across the globe and proved super hit at the box office. The movie had a strong start in both Indian and overseas market with nearly 70% occupancy. The film has collected approximately Rs 58 million at the Indian Box Office on its 1st day and its performance is far better than that of several Telugu films of 2012.

In the US the movie raked in a storming US$100,000 for 3 days. The audience response for the movie on the first day was better than that of recent releases like Devudu Chesina Manushulu, Onamalu, Uu Kodathara? Ulikki Padathara? and Adhinayakudu. Excluding Julayi, Eega, Rachcha and Gabbar Singh, no other Telugu movie has received such a good response at the USA Box Office in recent months. According to trade analyst Taran Adarsh, the film has taken Rs 2,455,000 ($44,255) from its screening in the country on Thursday and Friday.

Ravi Teja's Devudu Chesina Manushulu had collected Rs 348,000 ($6,288) from 29 screens on the first day. Onamalu had grossed Rs 180,000 ($3,243) in the first weekend. Adhinayakudu had raked in Rs 545,000 ($9,844) on its opening day in the country. Sudigadu collected a total collections of till end of its run(worldwide)

Soundtrack

The music launch of Sudigadu was held on 23 July in Hyderabad. Sri Vasanth has scored the music and it was also reported that Allari Naresh also sang a song in this film. The audio was released by Dasari, who handed over the first copy to Tanish, Nikhil, and Uday Kiran. It is the only film which had a Platinum Disc Function before the release of its audio.
The song Gajibiji Gathukula Roaddu is copied from the song "Diva Diva" from the Kannada movie Johny Mera Naam Preethi Mera Kaam

List of notable spoofs
Sudigadu is a movie made based on many popular films in the past 10 Years and can be termed both a satire & homage to Telugu cinema.

Qualifications of a Telugu cinema hero (by the director)
 Heroes worship their mother more than gods and goddesses (even in these days when all send their parents to old age homes).
 Heroes take utmost care of their sisters and save them from any small to big problems.
 Heroes are capable of making heroines fall in love with them although heroines are rich & heroes are poor.
 Heroes punish anyone who does crime and harm to society, even though they are the fathers of heroines (to be frank, heroes always love villain's daughters)
 Heroes (wearing modern costumes) always give lectures to heroines to follow the customs & traditions. (but they dance only with the heroines wearing modern costumes only)
 Heroes feel their friend's sisters to be their sisters (there is a scope of change in opinion if one of their friend's sisters is very beautiful)
 Heroes can fight the crimes & injustice prevailing in the society very easily
 Heroes can ride air planes and helicopters if necessary, although it is the first time they see these.
 Heroes always remain fresh even after long fights with hundreds of men.
 Heroes have a six pack body, and are experts in dialogue delivery and fighting skills.

Parts of a hero (by the director)
 Brain – 24x7 solves the problems faced by the people in the society.
 Eyes – get red in color with anger after seeing the injustice done to the people & crimes committed in the society.
 Mouth – speaks hi-fi punch dialogues very easily.
 Shoulders – carry on the Indian financial system.
 Heart – always strives for the poor (when heroine is not beside him).
 Hands – has the capacity to defeat hundreds of powerful villains.
 Feet – makes the land prosper with all riches and happiness with its one touch.

Film episodes

 Eega – the style of opening & closing credits are adapted from S.S. Rajamouli's Eega i.e. the whole story is a narrative of a father to his daughter.
 Chatrapati – Bhavani scene
 Racha – in the first fight scene the hero spoofs a dialogue from "Racha".
 Businessman – most of the dialogues of the film "Business Man" are uttered by the hero, but in hilarious situations.
 Simha – the villain's son, upon getting kicked by the hero as infant goes into a coma and the doctors suggest he can be revived only after he gets kicked again by the hero.
 Jalsa – the villain's son responds from the wheelchair when the hero passes by him.
 Chandramukhi – the hero's entrance in the first fight scene
 Maryada Ramanna – The villain cannot kill people outside his house – only within. (As compared to the opposite condition in the original movie.)
 Pokiri – the hero's real identity being that of a police officer.
 Boys and 7G Brundavan colony – the hero's gang is hanging out on a wall and a friend's dad (Suman Shetty reprises the role of Chandra Mohan) admonishes him for 'wasting his (blood) money on cigarettes'.
 Premikudu – the hero attempts to impress the heroine through dance. The funny side comes as Naresh draws face of a monkey rather than heroine.
 Athadu - All the scenes' location and time appears in the typical Athadu style at the bottom of the screen. Eg: Time vaachipoyindi, Gabbar Singh release ayyi collections tsunami srusthistunna time lo..
 Mass– another attempt of the hero to impress the heroine by telling her to spend 10 minutes time with her during which he takes her to a home where he has adopted failed-love people.
 Robo – hero scans various dance books at a time in no time to learn dance and impress his lover. Also he kills a villain by catching the bullet left by his gun, made a lot of bullets and firing them on the goons stating "Happy Diwali Folks".
 Dookudu – the hero utters the famous dialogue "Mind lo fix aithe blind ga velipotha" (I go blindly if I am fixed in my mind) but following the dialogue, he hits a rack in his room.
 Nuvvu Nenu - MS Narayana tells the famous dialogue " Mee peddolu unnare...Maa youth feelings yeppatiki artham kesukoru" in a sad and comical way after getting scolded by his father.
 Ye Maaya Chesave – the heroine refuses to court the hero on accounting of being older to him by a day.
 Tagore – hero murders a lady "adam teaser" who rapes several men with the help of a banana peel
 Bharateeyudu – hero murders a criminal by showing him a scene from a daily serial Pootha Rekulu (Parody of Mogali Rekulu) in large no. of televisions at a time as the criminal was the main reason for water problems in the city.
 Magadheera & Kushi – heroine gets a shock during her childhood when a boy touches her. In the present hero touches the hand of heroine's hand which gives her a shock. She hugs him and confesses that she loves him, but the unknown truth to her is that the shock was due to an electric battery kept in the hero's mouth. A sorcerer finds the location of hero through google which is the satire of sorcerer character in Magadheera.
 Aparichitudu – hero takes a criminal to a buffalo shed but fails to create a buffalo stampede, which happens in Aparichitudu. Seeing this the criminal dies laughing as he was a heart patient, which was hero's main motive.
 Khadgam –  Prudhvi Raj plays the role of 30 Years Corporator which is similar to his role as 30 Year Industry in Khadgam
 Khaleja – Srinivas Reddy plays a role similar to the role of Shafi 
 Peddarayudu – Dharmavarapu Subrahmanyam plays a role which is a satire of Mohan Babu in Pedarayudu.
 Narasimha – a bullet goes back after seeing hero in front of it. (There an enraged bull runs away seeing the hero)
 Mr. Perfect – the advice given by Nassar to Prabhas is mentioned by hero's grandmother to him in a hilarious way
 Leader – the advice given by Suhasini to Rana is mentioned by hero's grandmother to him in a hilarious way
 Oosaravelli– the dialogue "Current wire naa laga sanaga untadi, cani mutukunte shock isthadi" is said by Allari Naresh in a comical way as well
 Sasirekha Parinayam & Chandamama  – Yenduke Cheli song is pictured in a similar way to Elaa Entha Sepu song from Sasirekha Parinayam and Bugge Bangaarama song from Chandamama.
 Challenge (reality Show) – the famous reality dance program is mimicked in a hilarious fashion. A typical judgment segment involving Omkar and three judges (Sundaram Master, Shiva Shankar Master and Posani Kirshna Murali) is presented after Naresh's dance performance. Shiva Shankar Master and Posani Kirshna Murali have acted as themselves in this scene.
 7th Sense – hero controls the minds of henchmen using hypnosis by just looking at them.
 Bommarillu – heroine saying to a bull that it would get horns if it does not hit M.S. Narayana twice.
 Gabbar Singh – hero says the famous "Naakkonchem Tikkundi.. Kaanee Daaniki O Lekkundi.." in a comic way.
 Arya – heroine and her father exchange characters like hero and heroine in this movie.
 Siva – hero's name and villain and his side kick are portrayed similarly with the same names.
 Suryavamsam – hero becomes rich within a song similar to this movie.
 Indra – hero kisses land before entering his native place.
 Run – hero is chased by thugs. He uses white paint to color his hair and the thugs find him but are unable to recognize him though he's in the same dress.
 Gharshana – the opening scene of the movie is imitated in a comic way by the hero.
 Dammu – the dialogue "padi taraalu ne vamsam lo maga pilladini kanali ante bayapadathaaru" is said in the film.
 Kondapalli Raja – hero challenges heroine's father about becoming richer than him.
 Julai – the dialogue "puvvulni ammayilani chupinchandi ra" is said by one of the thugs in a comic way.
 Thammudu - Kovai Sarala does what the hero does in Travelling Soldier song in the original comically to show the sacrifices she made for Allari Naresh.
 Arunachalam - hero creates a flower magically and throws it behind intended to hit the heroine, but in this case, he does it twice and they both miss the aim and hit the heroine's father and maid.
 All movies of S. S. Rajamouli – hero shows all the weapons used in Rajamouli's movies to a lady villain and asks her to commit suicide using any one of the weapons.
 Simhadri– the doctor frantically checks the reports of goons beaten by the hero in the first fight, though the director made it funny.

Awards

References

External links 
 

2012 films
Indian parody films
Indian action comedy films
Telugu remakes of Tamil films
2010s parody films
2010s Telugu-language films
2012 action comedy films
Films directed by Bhimaneni Srinivasa Rao
2012 comedy films